People who choose to run across Australia can choose to run from either of the geographical extremes of the continent, or from directly opposed cities on opposite shores. The westernmost geographical extreme of Australia is Steep Point, whereas the easternmost extreme is Cape Byron. Similarly, the northernmost geographical extreme is Cape York Peninsula, and the southernmost is the South East Cape. The westernmost capital city in Australia is Perth, and the easternmost capital city is Brisbane. The northernmost city is Darwin, and the southern to the southernmost city is Hobart.

Runners who choose to circumambulate Australia can follow the National Highway for large sections of their journey. Distances involved are in the vicinity of  depending on the route taken.

†Distance calculated utilising the resources of Geoscience Australia.

Completed journeys
The names of the individuals who have run across Australia have been listed below in chronological order. Sources for data contained within this table have been listed within the body of the article, or where not readily available, directly from the individual concerned.

George Perdon
George Perdon ran across Australia during the 1973 Trans-Continental Run, completing the  journey in 47 days, 1 hour and 54 minutes.

Perdon became a household name in 1973 when competing in the 1973 Trans Australia race and racing his rival - Tony Rafferty. Perdon was unable to get time off work at the appropriate time and missed the official start, giving Rafferty one week's head start before heading off from Fremantle. Perdon was to end up beating Rafferty into Sydney by a day. They took slightly different routes during the run, causing the run to generate front-page headlines for a majority of the journey.

Perdon died on 29 June 1993.

Tony Rafferty
In 1972, Tony Rafferty became the first man to run from Melbourne to Sydney, pioneering ultra-distance running in Australia. He was also the first man to run from Perth to Adelaide, Adelaide to Brisbane, Melbourne to Brisbane and Sydney to Brisbane. In 1978, he became the first man to run from Melbourne to Sydney and return. In August to October 1973 Tony became the first person to run from Fremantle to the Gold Coast, and in the process became the first person to run across the Nullarbor Plain. He completed the run in 74 days.

Tony has received many commendations for his achievements. Most notably, he was a Torch Bearer for the Sydney 2000 Olympic Games, and the recipient of the Medal of the Order of Australia (OAM) in 2002 for services to Ultramarathon Running and the promotion of Community Fitness.

Ron Grant

In 1983, Ron Grant ran  around Australia in 217 days. Ron completed the run in an anticlockwise direction. Starting in Brisbane, he then proceeded to Townsville, Mt Isa, Darwin, Perth, Adelaide, Melbourne, Sydney, then back to Brisbane. Soon after this achievement, he was awarded the Queensland Sportsman of the year Award in 1983, Queenslander of the Year in 1984, and the Order of Australia in 1984.

Sarah Covington Fulcher
Fulcher describes her journey through remote areas in an interview with Bryant Gumbel on NBC's Today Show. "Sarah Fulcher set her incredible record one marathon at a time. It was an unparalleled feat that will take a heck of a commitment to beat. During her record run, Fulcher averaged 10 minutes per mile." "This would also make her the youngest person (at that time) to make any transcontinental run."

"Sarah Fulcher, an attractive, smiling, 25-year-old native of Winston Salem, N. C., jogged through Sequin this week on her way back to Laguna Hills, Calif., near Los Angeles, from where she began her 11,000 mile run...the world's longest, continuous solo run in history. "Fulcher has been recognized by untold news organizations and government organizations including the Connecticut General Assembly Permanent Committee on the Status of Women's (CTPCSW) publication Selected Highlights of Women's History (page 38) and the United States Congressional Record in a "Salute to Sarah Covington Fulcher".

Robert Garside

He started and finished in New Delhi on 20 October 1997, and finished on 13 June 2003. He had completed his Australian leg of the run by April 2000.

Serge Girard

The world record remained intact until beaten by Achim Heukemes in 2005.

Jesper Olsen

Jesper Olsen is a Danish marathon runner who ran across Australia as part of his first journey around the world. He departed from Sydney on 31 October 2004, and arrived in Perth on 11 February 2005. He completed the journey in 104 days, before proceeding onto Los Angeles to complete the American leg of his run around the world.

Achim Heukemes
Achim Heukemes (born 1951 in Wuppertal, Germany) is an ultramarathon runner known for his 4,568-kilometre run through Australia. He started from Fremantle on 2 April 2005 and finished in Sydney 43 days, 13 hours and 8 minutes later. By this feat, he beat the previous world record of Serge Girard from 1999.

Remi Camus

Rémi Camus ran across Australia, Capital to Capital, Melbourne to the Top End, Darwin. He recorded his journey with 2 video cameras. He also raised money for a charity, Syndrome of Lowe, a genetic disease that affect mostly boys.

Cesar Guarin
Cesar Guarin ran across Australia in 2011, as part of his Global Run for an advocacy to help Filipino children experiencing poverty. The Australian run hoped to raise $200,000 funds.

Pat Farmer

Pat Farmer established the fastest around Australia long run record of continuous running in 191 days and 10 minutes (around 6 months) over  during his Centenary of Federation run. He set a total of ten international records including the Western Australia border to border run, the Brisbane to Darwin run, and the world record for the longest tropics run ( in 83 days).

Deborah De Williams 
Deborah De Williams  successfully walked around Australia in 2003–04, and set a world record for the longest walk by any woman in the process. On 25 October 2008, she began running from Hobart in an anti-clockwise direction to raise funds for the national breast Cancer Foundation. She made it to Darwin before being injured, and was subsequently forced to withdraw from the run on 5 June 2009. On 27 March 2010, she restarted her run again from Hobart and successfully circumambulated the continent on 8 May 2011. In doing so, she set another world record for the longest run for a woman.  In 2015 Deborah was awarded the Member of the Order of Australia in the Australia Day Honours for her service to the cancer community and ultra marathoning community and in doing so is officially recognised as the first woman to run around Australia.

Patrick Malandain
Patrick Malandain (born 1960) ran across Australia from Sydney to Fremantle (Perth) during the 2013 Trans-Continental Run, completing the race in 38 days, 12 hours and 58 minutes. He breaks Achim Heukemes's record since 2005.. It's the new world record.

Janette Murray-Wakelin and Alan Murray
Experienced ultra-marathoners Janette Murray Wakelin and Alan Murray successfully ran around Australia in 2013. They followed predominantly Highway 1. Janette Murray-Wakelin and Alan Murray promoted the raw food movement and demonstrated its function to sustain the human body in optimum performance. They only consumed raw plant matter to fuel their whole run.

Tony Mangan
Tony Mangan ran across Australia south to north on his world run (in which he covered 50000 km in 4 Years from 2010 to 2014)
Started on Australian mainland in Queenscliff, Melbourne on March 13. Finish Australian mainland in Nightscliff Beach, Darwin  (Nightscliff Pool) May 25. Distance run on the mainland was 3777 km in 69 road days. Average distance run per road day was 54.73 km. 5 rest days taken. Average distance including rest days was 51 km for the 74 days. This has been declared as a new Melbourne to Darwin Trans Australian record by Phil Essam former Australian ultra running vice president, historian, statistician and author. Hobart Airport to Burnie, Tasmania and including the mainland has also been declared a second Trans Australian record for Tasmania to Darwin. Total Australian distance run 4,064 km

Mark Allison
Mark Allison is known as Run Geordie Run and as part of his charity money raising he completed the run across Australia in January 2014.

James Brooman
James Brooman ran from Cottesloe Beach, Perth, to Bondi Beach, Sydney. The journey was solo and unsupported, with James pushing a buggy the entire distance. The route took him through Kalgoorlie, across the Nullarbor on Highway 1 and through the Blue Mountains via Cowra. Prior to this journey James was an inexperienced runner, completing 3 marathons since 1999, and began his running training for this challenge in December 2014.

Tom Denniss
Tom, who lives in Sydney, ran across Australia from Perth to Sydney in 2013.  It was the final leg on his world circumnavigation run, which he commenced on New Year's Day, 2012, in Sydney.  The trans-Australia leg was 97 days from June 10 to Sept 13, 2013, covering 5,000 km from Cottesloe Beach in Perth, to Kalgoorlie, Norseman, then across the Nullabor Plain, then Melbourne and finally Sydney, where he completed his world run on Friday, 13 September 2013.  His circumnavigation totalled 26,232 km, the equivalent of 622 marathons in 622 days.  This was the fastest ever circumnavigation of the Earth on foot, some 40 days quicker than Jesper Olsen's earlier circumnavigation, a record which still stands (as at March 2016). Tom used his world run as an opportunity to raise funds for Oxfam, with over $50,000 raised throughout the journey.

Jason P. Lester
The first American male to run across Australia. Jason P. Lester's Trans Australia Run started in Scarborough Beach, Western Australia and ended 135 days later in Bateman's Bay, New South Wales. Lester ran 118 days, 2,633 miles, of which 2,000 miles were self supported pulling his gear in a 50 lb cart.

Greg Brown 
Greg ran the East Coast of Australia from Cockle Creek on the South East Cape of Tasmania to the top of Cape York, Queensland following the coast as close as possible totalling 5,500 km. He did it to raise money for The Cancer Council under the title of 'Cape to Cape for Cancer'. He started on the 2nd of April 2016, had the 7th of April off to catch the ferry across Bass Strait, then continuing along the coast to Cape York. Finishing on the 22nd of June 2016 only 82 days after starting.

Andre Jones 
At the age of 56, Andre, who lives in Melbourne after serving 18 years in the Royal Australian Navy, ran solo and unsupported across Australia from Melbourne to Darwin in 93 days, between 10 March 2017 and 13 June 2017. In the 93 days, he took 9 days of rest (5 of which was to recover from an infected ant bite). From Melbourne, he travelled west to Adelaide then north to Darwin along the Stuart Highway via Port Augusta, Marla and Alice Springs, camping along the road when no other accommodation was available. Covering the approximately 3,700 km in the 84 running days, he averaged 44 km per day. As Andre was solo, he pushed the Intrepid (a custom made buggy) which carried his water, camping gear and supplies; when fully stocked it weighed as much as 95 kg. Andre used this journey to raise funds and awareness for beyondblue.

Richard Bowles 
Richard Bowles covered the entire length of the Great Dividing Range, along Australia' Bicentennial National Trail at 5,330 km. He is the only person on this list to take his run 100% off-road, taking on the Australia Alpine country and wading the Daintree River.

See also
 Fundraising
 List of people who have walked across Australia
 Running
 Twenty-first-century fundraising walks in Tasmania
 Ultra-marathon running

References

Run across Australia
Run across Australia
Australia
Aust